To calculate the seeding for the 2002 FIFA World Cup, FIFA used the FIFA World Rankings in combination with performances of national teams in the three previous World Cups. The formula is virtually identical with the one used for the 1998 FIFA World Cup seeding.

For the ranking part, points were allocated on the basis of 32 for the best achieving of the 32 qualifiers for 2002 FIFA World Cup in each of the three fields considered, down to one for the lowest ranking.

For the World Cup performance part, points were allocated as follows:

 Teams qualified for the knockout stages were ranked by their overall performance and received between 32 points (World Cup winner) and 17 points (the losing quarter finalist with the worst overall performance).
 Teams eliminated in the group stage were ranked by their performance. The top half received 9 points, the rest 8 points.

The seedings table uses these points obtained from the 1990 FIFA World Cup, 1994 FIFA World Cup and the 1998 FIFA World Cup averaged in a 1:2:3 ratio respectively, added to the average number of points derived from the World Rankings at three given dates (at ratio 1:1:1), December 1999, December 2000, and November 2001. All totals are rounded.

South Korea and Japan were seeded as hosts, France as defending champions. The other seeds were: Brazil, Argentina, Italy, Germany and Spain.

References

Seeding
FIFA World Cup seeding